Air Incheon is a South Korean cargo airline with its base at Seoul Incheon International Airport. It serves five scheduled cargo destinations from its base in Seoul.

Destinations

Air Incheon serves the following scheduled destinations (as of July 2021):

Fleet

Current fleet
The Air Incheon fleet consists of the following aircraft (as of July 2021):

Fleet development
In August 2016, Air Incheon signed a letter of intent for three Boeing 737-800NG to be converted to freighters and leased from Spectre Air Capital. In May 2019, due to financial reasons, Air Incheon cancelled the order for Boeing 737-800NG Freighter as well as retiring its Boeing 767-300ERF and one Boeing 737-400F.

Former fleet
Air Incheon has also operated the following aircraft (as of July 2021):

References

External links

Official website 
Official website 

Airlines established in 2012
Airlines of South Korea
Cargo airlines of South Korea
South Korean companies established in 2012